The Monument-National is a historic Canadian theatre located at 1182 Saint Laurent Boulevard in Montreal, Quebec. With a capacity of over 1,600 seats, the venue was erected between 1891 and 1894 and was originally the cultural centre of the Saint-Jean-Baptiste Society.

The building was designed by Maurice Perrault, Albert Mesnard, and Joseph Venne in the Renaissance Revival style and utilizes a steel frame—a building technique that was innovative for its time.

Yiddish theatre
The first performance of a Yiddish play was held there in what is now the theatre's Ludger-Duvernay room in the winter of 1896. The Monument-National was a key cultural landmark in Montreal's historic Jewish quarter, and it continued to host productions from touring and local Yiddish theatre companies until the 1940s.

Renovations and current status
The theatre was declared a historic monument by the Ministère des Affaires culturelles du Québec in 1976 and a National Historic Site in 1985.

A major restoration project of the theatre was completed in June 1993 in time for the theatre's centennial celebration. The 1,620-seat theatre has been owned by the National Theatre School of Canada since 1971, and it is the venue used for its productions.

References

External links
History of the Monument-National

Ashkenazi Jewish culture in Montreal
National Historic Sites in Quebec
Theatres in Montreal
Theatres on the National Historic Sites of Canada register
Heritage buildings of Quebec
Jewish Canadian history
Jews and Judaism in Montreal
Yiddish culture in Canada
Yiddish theatre
Theatres completed in 1894
Quartier des spectacles
Renaissance Revival architecture in Canada
University and college buildings in Canada
1894 establishments in Quebec